R-3 regional road is a Montenegrin roadway.

It serves as connection between Pljevlja and Bosnia and Herzegovina.

History

In January 2016, the Ministry of Transport and Maritime Affairs published bylaw on categorisation of state roads. With new categorisation, new R-3 regional road on this route was established from previous municipal road.

Major intersections

References

R-3